The 1988 NCAA Division I Cross Country Championships were the 50th annual NCAA Men's Division I Cross Country Championship and the 8th annual NCAA Women's Division I Cross Country Championship to determine the team and individual national champions of NCAA Division I men's and women's collegiate cross country running in the United States. In all, four different titles were contested: men's and women's individual and team championships.

Held on November 21, 1988, the combined meet was hosted by Iowa State University at Jester Park in Granger, Iowa. The distance for the men's race was 10 kilometers (6.21 miles) while the distance for the women's race was 5 kilometers (3.11 miles).

The men's team national championship was won by Wisconsin, their third national title. The individual championship was won by Bob Kennedy, also from Indiana, with a time of 29:20.

The women's team national championship was won by Kentucky, their first national title. The individual championship was won by Michelle Dekkers, from Indiana, with a time of 16:30.

Qualification
All Division I cross country teams were eligible to qualify for the meet through their placement at various regional qualifying meets. In total, 22 teams and 184 runners contested the men's championship while 15 teams and 135 runners contested the women's title.

Men's title
Distance: 10,000 meters (6.21 miles)

Men's Team Result (Top 10)

Men's Individual Result (Top 10)

Women's title
Distance: 5,000 meters (3.11 miles)

Women's Team Result (Top 10)

Women's Individual Result (Top 10)

See also
NCAA Men's Cross Country Championships (Division II, Division III)
NCAA Women's Cross Country Championships (Division II, Division III)

References
 

NCAA Cross Country Championships
NCAA Division I Cross Country Championships
NCAA Division I Cross Country Championships
NCAA Division I Cross Country Championships
Track and field in Iowa
Dallas County, Iowa
Polk County, Iowa
Iowa State University